Life Sciences Switzerland (LS2) is the Swiss federation of scientific societies for life sciences. It was formerly known as the Union of the Swiss Societies for Experimental Biology (USGEB).

Life Sciences Switzerland is a member of the Swiss Academy of Natural Sciences (SCNAT).

LS2 sections 
Its members are:
 LS2 Section Molecular and Cellular Biology (Swiss Society of Molecular and Cellular Biosciences (SSMCB) fused with Life Sciences Switzerland in June 2015)
 LS2 Physiology section (Swiss Society of Physiology (SSP) – fused with Life Sciences Switzerland in June 2015)
 LS2 Section Proteomics (Swiss Society of Proteomics (SPS) – fused with Life Sciences Switzerland in June 2015)

LS2 partner societies 
 Swiss Society of Anatomy, Histology and Embryology (SSAHE)
 Swiss Society of Experimental Pharmacology (SSEP)
 Swiss Chemical Society (SCS)

LS2 affiliated societies 
 Swiss Society of Microbiology (SGM)
 Swiss Society for Neuroscience (SSN)
 Swiss Laboratory Animal Science Association (SGV-SSEAL)
 Swiss Plant Science Web (SPSW)
 Swiss Society of Pathology (SSPath)
 Swiss Society of Plant Physiology (SGPf)
 Società Ticinese delle Scienze Biomediche e Chimiche (STSBC)

Annual meetings

Notes and references

See also 
 Swiss Academies of Arts and Sciences
 Science and technology in Switzerland
 Pharmaceutical industry in Switzerland
 Federation of European Biochemical Societies
 International Union of Biochemistry and Molecular Biology

External links 
 Official website

Science and technology in Switzerland
Scientific organisations based in Switzerland
Life sciences industry